The Welsh Manuscripts Society, also known as the Society for the Publication of Ancient Welsh Manuscripts, was an organisation formed in Abergavenny, Wales, in 1837.

It was led by prominent members of the clergy and other notables including Taliesin Williams. It had the purpose of collecting, studying, and, as a text publication society, of publishing manuscripts relating to the ancient poetry, prose and historiography of Britain and Wales.

Its final publication was Barddas; or, a collection of original documents, illustrative of the theology, wisdom and usages of the Bardo-Druidic system of the isle of Britain, edited and translated by Rev. John Williams (Ab Ithel). The first volume appeared in 1862; and the second volume, in an incomplete form, in 1874.

References

External links
 Meic Stephens, Hen bersoniaid llengar, Oxford University Press

Clubs and societies in Wales
Text publication societies
1837 establishments in Wales
Defunct learned societies of the United Kingdom